The beautiful sibia (Heterophasia pulchella) is a species of bird in the family Leiothrichidae. It is found in China, India, and Myanmar.

Its natural habitat is subtropical or tropical moist montane forest.

References

Collar, N. J. & Robson C. 2007. Family Timaliidae (Babblers)  pp. 70 – 291 in; del Hoyo, J., Elliott, A. & Christie, D.A. eds. Handbook of the Birds of the World, Vol. 12. Picathartes to Tits and Chickadees. Lynx Edicions, Barcelona.

beautiful sibia
Birds of Northeast India
Birds of Myanmar
Birds of Yunnan
beautiful sibia
Taxonomy articles created by Polbot